The Evangelical Lutheran Church in Sierra Leone is an Evangelical Lutheran church in Sierra Leone. With a membership of around 3,150, it has been a member of the Lutheran World Federation since 1990. It is also affiliated with the All Africa Conference of Churches, the Council of Churches in Sierra Leone, the Inter-Religious Council of Sierra Leone and the Lutheran Communion in Central and Eastern Africa. Its head is Bishop Thomas J. Barnett.

References

Lutheranism in Africa
Churches in Sierra Leone
Lutheran World Federation members